José Venancio López Hierro (born 27 June 1964) is a Spanish former futsal player, and the current manager of the Spanish national futsal team.

Coaching achievements
Silver medalist at the FIFA Futsal World Cup in 2008
UEFA Futsal Championship champion (2): 2007, 2010
Futsal European Clubs Championship champion in 2000
Intercontinental Futsal Cup champion: 2000
División de Honor de Futsal LNFS champion: 1998/99
Copa de España de Futsal champion (3): 1999, 2000, 2006
Spanish Futsal Super Cup (3): 1999, 2000, 2001
Winner of the Cup Winners' Cup: 2007

External links
José Venancio López Hierro at futsalplanet

1964 births
Living people
Sportspeople from Bilbao
Spanish men's futsal players
Spanish futsal coaches